Rari Nantes Camogli is an Italian water polo club based in Camogli, Liguria.

History 
The club was founded in 1914 by Enrico Corzetto and Tiziano De Nardi.

Titles 
 Italian League
 1935, 1946, 1952, 1953, 1955, 1957

Current team
 Lorenzo Gardella
 Jacopo Celli
 Matteo Antonucci
 Jacopo Guenna
 Matteo Pino
 Nicolo' Gatti

References

External links 
 Official website

Water polo clubs in Liguria    
Water polo clubs in Italy
Sport in Liguria
Sports clubs established in 1914
1914 establishments in Italy